Siilitie metro station (- "Hedgehog Way") is a ground-level station on the Helsinki Metro. It serves the northern part of the district of Herttoniemi in East Helsinki. There are 117 bicycle and 111 car parking spaces at the station. Both lines M1 and M2 serve Siilitie.

Siilitie was one of the original stations on the system, and was opened on the first day of operation on 1 June 1982. It was designed by Jaakko Ylinen and Jarmo Maunula. It is located 1.3 kilometres north-east of Herttoniemi metro station and 2.1 kilometres west of Itäkeskus metro station.

Name 
Siilitie (unofficially translated into English as Hedgehog Way) is a veritable oddity in the station naming scheme of the Helsinki metro. As the station is named after the street on which it is located, Siilitie's name is unconventional, because stations on the Helsinki metro tend to be named either after the neighborhood, university, or square which it serves.

References

External links

Herttoniemi
Helsinki Metro stations
Railway stations opened in 1982
1982 establishments in Finland